Eugene Boynton Kimball  (August 31, 1850 – August 2, 1882) was an American professional baseball player for the Cleveland Forest Citys during the 1871 season.

He was the original slap hitter, posting a .008 ISO in 1871. He only had one extra-base hit, a double.

External links
Baseball Reference
Fangraphs

Cleveland Forest Citys (NABBP) players
Cleveland Forest Citys players
19th-century baseball players
Baseball players from New York (state)
Sportspeople from Rochester, New York
1850 births
1882 deaths
Burials at Mount Hope Cemetery (Rochester)